Yusefabad or Yusofabad or Yoosef Abad or Yusafabad or Yoosof Abad, also rendered as Yusufabad

Chaharmahal and Bakhtiari Province
 Yusefabad, Chaharmahal and Bakhtiari, a village in Ardal County

East Azerbaijan Province
 Yusefabad, Bostanabad, a village in Bostanabad County
 Yusofabad, Shabestar, a village in Shabestar County

Fars Province
 Yusefabad, Jahrom, a village in Jahrom County
 Yusefabad, Kazerun, a village in Kazerun County

Gilan Province
 Yusefabad, Amlash, a village in Amlash County
 Yusefabad, Rankuh, a village in Amlash County
 Yusefabad, Rasht, a village in Rasht County

Hamadan Province
 Yusefabad, Hamadan, a village in Asadabad County

Kerman Province
 Yusefabad, Anbarabad, a village in Anbarabad County
 Yusefabad, Fahraj, a village in Fahraj County
 Yusefabad-e Pain, a village in Fahraj County
 Yusefabad-e Salar, a village in Fahraj County
 Yusefabad, Manujan, a village in Manujan County
 Yusefabad, Eslamiyeh, a village in Rafsanjan County
 Yusefabad, Koshkuiyeh, a village in Rafsanjan County
 Yusefabad, Ravar, a village in Ravar County
 Yusefabad, Madvarat, a village in Shahr-e Babak County

Kohgiluyeh and Boyer-Ahmad Province
 Yusefabad, Kohgiluyeh and Boyer-Ahmad, a village in Boyer-Ahmad County

Kurdistan Province
 Yusofabad, Kurdistan, a village in Kamyaran County

Lorestan Province
 Yusefabad, Dorud
 Yusefabad, Kuhdasht
 Yusefabad Cham Chal
 Yusefabad-e Abdolmeni

Markazi Province
 Yusefabad, Markazi, a village in Saveh County

Mazandaran Province
 Yusefabad, Amol, a village in Amol County
 Yusefabad, Mahmudabad, a village in Mahmudabad County
 Yusefabad, Tonekabon, a village in Tonekabon County

Qazvin Province
 Yusefabad, Qazvin

Razavi Khorasan Province
 Yusefabad, Chenaran, a village in Chenaran County
 Yusefabad, Firuzeh, a village in Firuzeh County
 Yusefabad, Jowayin, a village in Jowayin County
 Yusefabad, Nishapur, a village in Nishapur County
 Yusefabad, Quchan, a village in Quchan County

Sistan and Baluchestan Province
Yusefabad, Irandegan, a village in Khash County
Yusefabad-e Tudak, a village in Khash County

South Khorasan Province
 Yusefabad-e Bam, a village in Tabas County

Tehran Province
 Yusefabad-e Khaleseh, a village in Varamin County
 Yusefabad-e Qavam, a village in Malard County
 Yusefabad-e Seyrafi, a village in Shahriar County

West Azerbaijan Province
 Yusefabad, Chaldoran, a village in Chaldoran County
 Yusefabad, Khoy, a village in Khoy County
 Yusefabad, Urmia, a village in Urmia County

Zanjan Province
 Yusefabad, Abhar, a village in Abhar County
 Yusefabad, Mahneshan, a village in Mahneshan County